Kara-Tash (formerly: imeni Kalinina) is a village in Osh Region of Kyrgyzstan. It is part of the Nookat District. Its population was 10,797 in 2021.

Population

References

Populated places in Osh Region